Camilla Henemark (born 23 October 1964), also known as La Camilla, is a Swedish singer, actress, political spokesperson and former fashion model.

Biography
Henemark was born in Stockholm, to a Nigerian father and a Swedish mother. She started her modeling career in her teens and later had her own modeling agency. Henemark started her career in music in 1985 by joining Alexander Bard in his Barbie project as Katanga. That project morphed into the group Army of Lovers, and soon La Camilla (as she is best known) became the face of the group. After two albums (and at least one public fight) with the group, she left and began a solo career. She released several singles that failed to achieve commercial success, and recorded at least one album that was never released (called Temper). Henemark then rejoined Army of Lovers in 1995 for their Les Greatest Hits album, in 2000 for their Le Grand Docu-Soap and in 2013 reunion album Big Battle of Egos, working with them on some of their most recent recordings until being fired and replaced by another former female member, Dominika Peczynski.

Besides music, Henemark has had an active career in TV and movies, and is an active supporter of the Swedish Social Democratic Party. She is currently single but was married to film director Anders Skog, and had a long-term relationship with pop star and music video director Stakka Bo (Johan Renck). She likes ice hockey and association football, and is well known for her liberal views on sex, gay rights, and life.

On 3 November 2010 the Swedish newspaper Aftonbladet published excerpts from a book about the Swedish King Carl XVI Gustaf, Den motvillige monarken ("The Reluctant Monarch"), claiming that he had a year-long love affair with Henemark in the late 1990s.

She has been diagnosed with attention deficit hyperactivity disorder (ADHD) and Asperger syndrome.

Discography 
See also Army of Lovers discography.

Albums

Singles

Acting credits

Film
1997 Eva & Adam - cameo
1998 Teater
2000 Sex, lögner & videovåld  - herself
2000 Livet Är En Schlager - cameo
2001 Jarrett (Encounters) - Chairman at EU Summit

Theatre
1995 Fyra Friares Fiaskon
2001 White Christmas

TV
1994 Sjunde Himlen (7th Heaven) - host
1997 Kenny Starfighter (mini series) - nurse
1997 Så ska det låta - herself
2000 Vita Lögner (White Lies, one episode) - co-host
2003 Big Brother (Swedish version) - guest

Music videos
1991 Army of Lovers - "Crucified" - chorus
1992 Entombed - "Strangers Aeons" - guest
1992 La Camilla - "Everytime You Lie" - Lead singer

References

External links

The Neverland Project Featuring La Camilla

1964 births
Artists with autism
Living people
People with Asperger syndrome
People with attention deficit hyperactivity disorder
Swedish people of Nigerian descent
Swedish dance musicians
Swedish female models
English-language singers from Sweden
Melodifestivalen contestants of 2013